Ribinsk was a Hansa A Type cargo ship which was built as Hendrik Fisser VI in 1943 by NV Werft Gusto, Schiedam, Netherlands for Fisser & Van Doornum, Emden Germany. She was seized as a prize of war in 1945, passing to the Ministry of War Transport and renamed Empire Garner. She was allocated to the Soviet Union in 1946 and was renamed Ribinsk. She served until 1975, when she was scrapped.

Description

The engine was built by NV Werft Gusto.

History
Hendrik Fisser VI was a Hansa A Type cargo ship built in 1943 as yard number 852 by NV Werft Gusto, Schiedam, Netherlands for Fisser & Van Doornum, Emden, Germany. She was launched in 1943 and completed in April 1944. Her port of registry was Emden.

In May 1945, Hendrik Fisser VI was seized as a prize of war at Kiel. The Code Letters GSPD and United Kingdom Official Number 180742 were allocated. Her port of registry was London and she was operated under the management of Currie Line Ltd.

In 1946, Empire Garner was allocated to the Soviet Union and was renamed Ribinsk. She was operated under the management of the Estonian Shipping Company. The Code Letters UKEH and register number M-1603 were allocated. Her port of registry was Tallinn. In 1949, she was transferred to the Sakhalin State Shipping Company, Kholmsk. She arrived at Izumiōtsu, Japan on 14 March 1975 for scrapping by Kyosho Tsusho.

References

1943 ships
Ships built by Gusto Shipyard
World War II merchant ships of Germany
Steamships of Germany
Empire ships
Ministry of War Transport ships
Merchant ships of the United Kingdom
Steamships of the United Kingdom
Merchant ships of the Soviet Union
Steamships of the Soviet Union